Jerónimo de Cáncer y Velasco (c. 1599 – 1655) was a playwright of the Spanish Golden Age.

Spanish poet and playwright. He was born in Barbastro in 1594, of noble family and protected from the counts of Moon and fog. Friend of the most important playwrights of his time, Moreto, Pedro Rosete Niño and Antonio Huerta. An improviser, intelligent, he used surprising play on words in conceptually. Described by Fray Andrés Ferro de Valdecebo as "the first to make puns with soul". He wrote only two plays without foreign collaboration: Baldovinos, prohibited by the Inquisition in 1790, death and the mocedades del Cid, burlesque tone 2. The rest of his plays were written in collaboration with other authors such as Matos and Moreto in: fall to lift, the gross of Babylon, remedy the pain and the penitent adulteress. Rosete and Martínez wrote the Ark of Noah and the best representative san Ginés. Most of these works were written to make money in a quick way, so are a combination of inspiration and imitation.

1590s births
1655 deaths
Spanish dramatists and playwrights
Spanish male dramatists and playwrights